The 300th Airlift Squadron is part of the 315th Airlift Wing at Charleston Air Force Base, South Carolina.  It operates Boeing C-17 Globemaster III aircraft supporting the United States Air Force global reach mission worldwide.

Mission

Train and equip C-17 aircrews for global air-land and airdrop operations.

History

World War II
During World War II the 300th airlifted military supplies from India to Allied forces in Burma and China in 1943.

Military Air Transport Service
It flew airlift missions within Japan and to Southeast Asia from 1952 to 1955.  The squadron airlifted US ex-prisoners of war from Japan to the U.S. following the Korean War and transported French troops wounded in the First Indochina War from Japan to France and Algeria in 1954.

Air Force Reserve
It has flown worldwide airlift missions since 1969.  Specifically, the 300th airlifted U.S. troops to Grenada and U.S. students from Grenada to the U.S. in 1983 and supported the 1989 contingency operation in Panama.  Received the Air Force Reserve Aircrew of the Year award twice.

Operations

World War II
Operation Urgent Fury
Operation Just Cause
1991 mobilized for the Gulf War

Lineage
 100th Air Transport Squadron
 Constituted as the 100th Transport Squadron on 4 June 1943
 Activated on 21 June 1943
 Disbanded on 1 December 1943
 Reconstituted and redesignated 100th Air Transport Squadron, Medium on 20 June 1952
 Activated on 20 July 1952
 Inactivated on 25 October 1955
 Consolidated with the 300th Military Airlift Squadron as the 300th Military Airlift Squadron on 19 September 1985

 300th Airlift Squadron
 Constituted as the 300th Military Airlift Squadron (Associate) on 31 July 1969
 Activated in the reserve on 25 September 1969
 Consolidated with the 100th Air Transport Squadron on 19 September 1985
 Redesignated 300th Airlift Squadron (Associate) on 1 February 1992
 Redesignated 300th Airlift Squadron on 1 October 1994

Assignments
 29th Transport Group, 21 June – 1 December 1943
 1503d Air Transport Wing, 20 July 1952
 1611th Air Transport Group, 9–25 October 1955
 943d Military Airlift Group, 25 September 1969
 315th Military Airlift Wing (later 315th Airlift Wing), 1 July 1973
 315th Operations Group, 1 August 1992 – present

Stations
 Sookerating Airfield, India, 21 June – 1 December 1943
 Haneda Air Base (later Tokyo International Airport), Japan, 20 Jul 1952 – 8 Oct 1955
 McGuire Air Force Base, New Jersey, 9–25 October 1955
 Charleston Air Force Base, South Carolina, 25 September 1969 – present

Aircraft

Douglas C-47 Skytrain (1943)
Curtiss C-46 Commando (1943)
Douglas C-54 Skymaster (1952–1955)
Lockheed C-141 Starlifter (1969–1997)
McDonnell Douglas C-17 Globemaster III (1997–present)

References

 Notes

Bibliography

External links
 

Military units and formations in South Carolina
300